Moylagh is a civil parish and townland in the northwest of County Meath, Ireland. The townland Moylagh lies within the Roman Catholic parish of Oldcastle and Moylagh.

See also
Drumone, village within the civil parish of Moylagh
Gortloney, nearby townland also in the civil parish of Moylagh

References

Civil parishes of County Meath